{{Album ratings
| rev1 = AbsolutePunk.net
| rev1Score = 77% 
| rev2 = AllMusic
| rev2Score =  
| rev3 = Tiny Mix Tapes
| rev3Score =  <ref name="Ranta">{{cite web | archiveurl = https://web.archive.org/web/20090731232008/http://www.tinymixtapes.com/Sarah-Blasko | url = http://www.tinymixtapes.com/Sarah-Blasko | title = Sarah Blasko – What the Sea Wants, the Sea Will Have | last = Ranta | first = Alan | work = Tiny Mix Tapes | archivedate = 31 July 2009 | accessdate = 21 July 2016 }}</ref>
| noprose = yes
}}What the Sea Wants, the Sea Will Have'' is the second album by Australian songwriter Sarah Blasko. The whole album can be listened to on Blasko's website.

The first radio-only single from the album is entitled "{Explain}". The second single lifted from the album is "Always on this Line" and the third single is "Planet New Year". The single "Amazing Things" was the last single from the album. The album cover was photographed by Warwick Baker. The album was certified Gold, for 35,000 physical copies sold, in Australia in January 2007.

At the J Award of 2006, the album was nominated for Australian Album of the Year.
At the ARIA Music Awards of 2007, the album won the ARIA Award for Best Pop Release.

Track listing

Credits
Sarah Blasko - Vocals, drum programming, synth, vibraphone, organ, Wurlitzer, acoustic guitar.
Robert F Cranny - Acoustic & electric guitars, piano, Mellotron, organ, harmonium, SH-101, drum machine, bass guitar on "For You", synth bass on "The Garden's End".
Jeff de Araujo - Drums and percussion
Jim Moginie - Mellotron, piano, wurlitzer, toy piano, Omnichord, electric guitar on "Hammer"
David Symes - Bass guitar, synth bass
Stéphanie Zarka - violin
Michele O'Young - violin
David Wicks - viola
Andy Hines - cello
Andy Meisel - double bass
Melaine Vanden Broek - bassoon

Charts

References

External links
Sarah Blasko's official site
Sarah Blasko fan site
Sarah Blasko Forum
Dew Process Records (Australia)
Low Altitude Records (United States)

2006 albums
ARIA Award-winning albums
Sarah Blasko albums
Albums recorded at Roundhead Studios